David Eldon Stephens (born February 8, 1962) is a retired male javelin thrower from United States, who twice represented his native country at the Summer Olympics: in 1988 and 1996. He set his personal best (83.88 metres) with the old javelin type on May 3, 1991, in Knoxville, Tennessee. Stephens is a 1987 graduate of California State University, Northridge.

Achievements

References

1962 births
Living people
American male javelin throwers
Athletes (track and field) at the 1988 Summer Olympics
Athletes (track and field) at the 1991 Pan American Games
Athletes (track and field) at the 1996 Summer Olympics
Olympic track and field athletes of the United States
Pan American Games track and field athletes for the United States